The men's 66 kilograms (Half lightweight) competition at the 2006 Asian Games in Doha was held on 4 December at the Qatar SC Indoor Hall.

Schedule
All times are Arabia Standard Time (UTC+03:00)

Results

Main bracket

Final

Top half

Bottom half

Repechage

References
Results

External links
Official website

M66
Judo at the Asian Games Men's Half Lightweight